Pikuli is a rural locality (a village) in Polozovoskoye Rural Settlement, Bolshesosnovsky District, Perm Krai, Russia. The population was 37 as of 2010. There are 2 streets.

Geography 
Pikuli is located on the Bolshoy Klyuch River, 52 km south of Bolshaya Sosnova (the district's administrative centre) by road. Berdyshevo is the nearest rural locality.

References 

Rural localities in Bolshesosnovsky District